Elite Football Women (EFD), is a Swedish interest organisation that represents the 26 elite football clubs in the top two divisions (Damallsvenskan and Elitettan) of the Swedish women's football league system. It was founded in Stockholm on 28 October 1978.

Organization
EFD does not administer the divisions, but instead acts in cooperation with the Swedish Football Association, the member clubs, sponsors and partners. The goal is to develop Swedish women's elite football resultwise, economically, commercially and administratively.

EFD holds all commercial and medial rights for licensing. Since 2015 EFD have arranged recordings and broadcasts of all Damallsvenskan matches, which can be viewed worldwide at Damallsvenskan.tv for a fee.

Secretaries-General

References

External links
 
Damallsvenskan.tv – web-broadcasting and recordings of Damallsvenskan matches.

Football in Sweden
1978 establishments in Sweden
Sports organizations established in 1978
Sports organizations of Sweden